The following list includes notable people who were born or have lived in Exeter, New Hampshire.

Academics and writing 

 Dan Brown (born 1964), author
 Lisa Bunker, author, NH state representative
 Andrew Coburn (1932–2018), author
 Sidney Darlington (1906–1997), electrical engineer; inventor of the Darlington pair
 William Perry Fogg (1826–1909), author, adventurer
 Michael Golay, historian, author
 Thomas Hassan, 14th principal of Phillips Exeter Academy; husband of New Hampshire Governor Maggie Hassan
 Todd Hearon, poet, musician
 Daniel Heartz (1928–2019), musicologist
 Charles Snead Houston (1913–2009), mountaineer, medical doctor, Peace Corps administrator, author
 John Irving (born 1942), author
 Dolores Kendrick (1927–2017), author, poet laureate of the District of Columbia, teacher at Phillips Exeter Academy
 John Knowles (1926–2001), author
 Adam Lanza (1992–2012), mass murderer
 Dudley Leavitt (1772–1851), publisher of Farmers Almanack and Miscellaneous Yearbook
 John Phillips (1719–1795), founder of Phillips Exeter Academy along with his wife Elizabeth
 William Robinson (benefactor) (1794-1864), school founder
 Edward L. Rowan, psychiatrist, author, Scouting leader
 Tabitha Gilman Tenney (1762–1837), novelist, proto-feminist
 James Monroe Whitfield (1822–1871), abolitionist poet "America and other poems" published 1853

Arts 

 Daniel Chester French (1850–1931), sculptor Abraham Lincoln at the Lincoln Memorial
 Elizabeth Jane Gardner (1837–1922), painter
 Jack Storms (born 1970), glass sculptor, entrepreneur; uses cold glass (fabricated glass) sculpting process to create his works; his glass Spectrum Cube and Tear Drop sculptures were used in the Marvel film Guardians of the Galaxy

Business 

 Enoch Poor (1736–1780), ship builder, merchant; Continental Army brigadier general
 Ambrose Swasey (1846–1937), mechanical engineer, inventor, entrepreneur, manager, astronomer, philanthropist
 Edward Tuck (1842–1938), banker, diplomat, philanthropist

Music 

 Lloyd Ahlquist (born 1977), a.k.a EpicLLOYD, internet musician/rapper
 Daniel Cartier (born 1969), singer and actor
 Patrick Baril (born 1982), a.k.a Statik Selektah, DJ, producer, CEO of Showoff Records
 Dan Zanes (born 1961), lead singer of The Del Fuegos and Dan Zanes and Friends

Politics and law 

 Frank C. Archibald (1857–1935), Vermont Attorney General
 Charles H. Bell (1823–1893), U.S. senator, 38th Governor of New Hampshire
 Lewis Cass (1782–1866), 2nd Territorial Governor of Michigan, President pro tempore of the Senate, 22nd U.S. Secretary of State
 Henry Alexander Scammell Dearborn (1783–1851), lawyer, soldier, U.S. congressman from Massachusetts 
 Nicholas Emery (1776–1861), judge, legislator from Maine
 Nathaniel Folsom (1726–1790), Founding Father, merchant, militia general, delegate to the Continental Congress
 John Taylor Gilman (1753–1828), 7th and 12th Governor of New Hampshire
 Nicholas Gilman, Jr. (1755–1814), Founding Father, signer of U.S. Constitution
 Maggie Hassan (born 1958), 81st Governor of New Hampshire, U.S. senator
 Moses Leavitt (1650–1730), early Exeter settler, selectman, Moderator of the General Court
 Gilman Marston (1811–1890), U.S. congressman, senator; Union Army general
 Tristram Shaw (1786–1843), U.S. congressman
 Henry Shute (1856–1943), lawyer, judge, author of "Plupy Shute" series
 Amos Tuck (1810–1879), attorney and congressman in New Hampshire; a founder of the Republican Party
 Rev. John Wheelwright (–1679), clergyman, founder of Exeter

Religion

 Tristram Gilman (1735–1809), minister, descendant of the sixth generation of the town's early settler, Edward Gilman

Sports 

 Victoria Arlen (born 1994), Paralympian swimmer 
 Chris Carpenter (born 1975), pitched for the Toronto Blue Jays and St. Louis Cardinals
 Fred Frame (1894–1962), auto racer, 1932 Indianapolis 500-winner
 Heather Jackson (born 1984), professional triathlete
 Kevin Romine (born 1961), right fielder for the Boston Red Sox
 Hunter Long (born 1998), Tight End for the Miami Dolphins

References

Exeter, New Hampshire
Exeter